Samaritans Foundation (or Samaritans) is an Australian-based charity operating in New South Wales. The organisation provides a number of social support services for the homeless and people with disabilities.

History
The roots of Samaritans was the Newcastle Anglican Board of Social Work operated by the Anglican Church in Newcastle. On October 14, 1984, the Newcastle Anglican Board of Social Work was redefined as the Samaritans Foundation (or “Samaritans”) with the expressed mission to “assist in the expansion of the social and community service work within the Diocese.” The organisation's early work began with a few key services including emergency relief, a family centre and op shops.

Homeless shelters
Samaritans operates a number of homelessness support services including youth refuges and women's shelters.

Youth refuges
Samaritans operates two youth refuges providing emergency accommodation for homeless youth. The refuges are:
Samaritans Youth Accommodation (Newcastle), formerly known as Clarendene House; and,
Samaritans Youth Accommodation (Maitland), formerly known as Maitland Youth Crisis Centre.

Women's shelters
Following the NSW government's Going Home Staying Home homelessness program, a number of women's refuges were closed, while others which had previously been feminist run domestic violence refuges were been handed over to large charity providers. In the wake of the reforms, Samaritans took over operations of the Kempsey Women's Refuge, now operating as the Kempsey Homeless Support Service for Women.

People
In February 2016, Samaritans appointed Peter Gardiner as the organisation's new CEO. The previous CEO, Cec Shevels, had held the post for 25 years before announcing his retirement from the Anglican organisation.

See also
Homelessness in Australia

References

Homelessness in Australia
Non-profit organisations based in New South Wales
Homeless shelters in Australia
Organizations established in 1984
Homelessness organizations
Anglican Church of Australia